Aris Leeuwarden is a Dutch professional basketball club based in Leeuwarden. The club competes in the BNXT League, and has competed at the highest national level since 2004. Aris plays its home games at the Kalverdijkje. Its most notable successes are reaching the DBL finals in 2013 and the NBB Cup final in 2020.

History
The parent club was actually founded in 1992, when the clubs Sporty and Ymir merged into BV Aris. In 2004 the professional team was founded, when the team promoted from the Promotiedivisie – the Dutch second-tier league – to the Eredivisie. The team, coached by Tom Simpson, was named Woon!Aris for sponsorship reasons and reached the Playoffs in its first season. After then, the team failed to reach the postseason for four seasons. In 2009–10, Aris, then named De Friesland Aris, reached the playoff semi-finals for the first time.

In the 2012–13 season, Aris was in financial trouble after it lost their main sponsor Lasaulec. Despite these circumstances Aris' squad – which included All-Stars Holcomb-Faye and Givens – reached the DBL Finals. Rival #1 seed Den Bosch was knocked out of the tournament 3–1 in the semi-finals. In the Finals Aris played ZZ Leiden and lost 0–4 to the #2 seed of the regular season.

Before the start of the 2013–14 Aris signed a new main sponsor in Univé, which guaranteed the existence of the team despite its ongoing financial struggles. The capacity of Kalverdijkje was also increased from 800 to 1,700 to further increase the stability for the club's future.

In the 2019–20 season, Aris reached the final of the Dutch Basketball Cup for the first time in history under head coach Ferried Naciri. The final, however, was never played as the season was cancelled due to the COVID-19 pandemic outbreak. The final, which was to be played against Donar, was cancelled as well after no new date could be found.

Since the 2021–22 season, Aris plays in the BNXT League, in which the national leagues of Belgium and the Netherlands have been merged.

Honours
Dutch Basketball League
Runners-up (1): 2012–13
Dutch Cup
Finalist (1): 2019–20
Semifinalist (4): 2012–13, 2013–14, 2015–16, 2021–22

Season by season

Players

Current roster

Depth chart

Notable players

 Meshack Lufile

Individual awards

All-DBL Team
Brandon Woudstra – 2005
Matt Bauscher – 2009
Rein van der Kamp – 2009
DBL All-Defense Team
Darius Theus – 2014

DBL Rookie of the Year
Valentijn Lietmeijer – 2012
DBL Statistical Player of the Year
Matt Bauscher – 2009
Samme Givens – 2013
Darius Theus – 2014

Top scorers by seasons

List of head coaches
The following list shows all head coaches of Aris Leeuwarden since its inception in 2004:

References

External links
Official website
Eurobasket.com Aris Leeuwarden Page

Sport in Leeuwarden
Basketball teams in the Netherlands
Basketball teams established in 2004
Dutch Basketball League teams